The 1970 Nobel Prize in Literature was awarded to the Russian novelist Aleksandr Solzhenitsyn (1918–2008) "for the ethical force with which he has pursued the indispensable traditions of Russian literature." For political reasons he would not receive the prize until 1974. Solzhenitsyn is the fourth Russian recipient of the prize after Ivan Bunin in 1933, Boris Pasternak in 1958 and Mikhail Sholokhov in 1965.

Laureate

Aleksandr Solzhenitsyn's works grew out of Russia's narrative traditions and reflect Soviet society. His debut, Odin den' Ivana Denisovicha ("One Day in the Life of Ivan Denisovich", 1962), and several of his later works, focus on life in the Soviet gulag camps. Solzhenitsyn's books often lack an obvious main character, moving instead between different characters at the center of the plot. This reflects a humanist view of the universality of human experience. Among his famous literary works include Rakovyi korpus ("Cancer Ward", 1966), V kruge pervom ("The First Circle", 1968), Avgust chetyrnadtsatogo ("August 1914", 1971), and Arkhipelag Gulag ("The Gulag Archipelago", 1973).

Deliberations

Nominations
In total, the Swedish academy received 128 nominations for 77 individuals. Solzhenitsyn received 9 nominations starting in 1969 before being awarded the 1970 prize. He received 6 nominations in 1970. 

Nominees included were Patrick White (awarded in 1973), Pablo Neruda (awarded in 1971), Heinrich Böll (awarded in 1972), Jorge Luis Borges and Tarjei Vesaas. 25 of the nominees were nominated first-time, among them Paavo Haavikko, Denis de Rougemont, Heðin Brú, Sei Itō, Tatsuzō Ishikawa, Hugo Bergmann, Alexander Lernet-Holenia, Fazıl Hüsnü Dağlarca, Amado Yuzon, Abraham Sutzkever and Mikhail Naimy. Repeated nominees included W. H. Auden, Jorge Amado, Graham Greene, André Malraux, Alberto Moravia, Vladimir Nabokov and Simon Vestdijk. The highest number of nominations were for the Norwegian novelist and poet, Tarjei Vesaas, with 9 nominations. Two of the nominees were women: Marie Under and Victoria Ocampo. The oldest nominee was Scottish writer Compton Mackenzie (aged 87) while the youngest was Finnish author Paavo Haavikko (aged 39). Korean writer Yi Kwang-su was nominated posthumously by the President of Korean PEN-Club, Chul Paik.

The authors Arthur Adamov, Antonio Abad, Louise Bogan, Vera Brittain, Rudolf Carnap, Fernand Crommelynck, Christopher Dawson, John Dos Passos, Leah Goldberg, Amado V. Hernandez, Richard Hofstadter, Roman Ingarden, B. H. Liddell Hart, John O'Hara, Charles Olson, Orhan Kemal, Máirtín Ó Cadhain, Alf Prøysen, Salvador Reyes Figueroa, Wilbur Daniel Steele, Elsa Triolet, and Fritz von Unruh died in 1970 without having been nominated for the prize. The Norwegian poet Tarjei Vesaas, Catalan writer Josep Carner, Italian poet Giuseppe Ungaretti died months before the announcement.

Prize decision
Alexander Solzhenitsyn had been considered for the prize the previous year. In 1970, five of the six members of the Swedish Academy's Nobel committee supported the proposal that Solzhenitsyn should be awarded the prize. Artur Lundkvist was however highly critical of the candidacy and opposed a prize to Solzhenitsyn. Lundkvist questioned the artistic value of Solzhenitsyn's work and argued that the Nobel prize in literature should not be a political prize. The other members of the committee supported a prize to Solzhenitsyn. Committee member Lars Gyllensten concluded that Solzhenitsyn "with a quantitatively rather small output appears as an impressively richly equipped, complicated and independently conscious author with a rare versatile material and unusual psychological ability of portrayal." The committee had also received several proposals from outside the Swedish Academy that Solzhenitsyn should be awarded the Nobel prize in literature, one such proposal came from the 1952 laureate Francois Mauriac and a number of other prominent French authors and cultural persons. While a majority of the members of the Nobel committee acknowledged that Solzhenitsyn was worthy of the prize, the committee was worried about how the authorities in the Soviet Union would react if Solzhenitsyn was awarded. For this reason the committee presented an alternative proposal with Patrick White and W.H. Auden as the main candidates weeks before the final vote, should it be known that Solzhenitsyn's life was in danger. On the final vote on 8 October 1970 Solzhenitsyn got the majority of the delivered votes from the members of the Swedish Academy.

Reaction and controversy
In 1969, Solzhenitsyn was expelled from the Russian Union of Writers. The following year, he was awarded the Nobel Prize in Literature, which he intentionally did not attend for fear that the USSR would prevent his return afterwards (his works there were circulated in samizdat—clandestine form). After the Swedish government refused to honor Solzhenitsyn with a public award ceremony and lecture at its Moscow embassy, Solzhenitsyn refused the award altogether, commenting that the conditions set by the Swedes (who preferred a private ceremony) were "an insult to the Nobel Prize itself." Solzhenitsyn did not accept the award and prize money until 10 December 1974, after he was deported from the Soviet Union. Within the Swedish Academy, member Artur Lundkvist had argued that the Nobel Prize in Literature should not become a political prize and questioned the artistic value of Solzhenitsyn's work.

Harassed by the Communist party and the KGB, Solzhenitsyn was fearful that if he goes to Stockholm to accept the Nobel medal and diploma, he would be stripped of his Soviet citizenship and prevented from coming home. Plans were arranged for the Swedish Academy's permanent secretary, Karl Ragnar Gierow, to give him the award in a Moscow apartment. But when Gierow was refused a Russian visa, Solzhenitsyn expressed his anger in an open letter he released to the press, asking the Swedish Academy to "keep the Nobel insignia for an indefinite period... If I do not live long enough myself, I bequeath the task of receiving them to my son."

Award ceremony
At the award ceremony in Stockholm City Hall on 10 December 1970, the permanent secretary of the Swedish Academy Karl Ragnar Gierow said: 

Solzhenitsyn could not receive the award until four years later. Presenting him the award, Gierow said at the award ceremony on 10 December 1974 : 

Solzhenitsyn's visit to Stockholm and his presence at the award ceremony in 1974 was much noticed in the Swedish press.

Nobel lecture
Alexander Solzhenitsyn delivered his Nobel lecture at the Swedish Academy on 7 December 1974.

References

External links
Award Ceremony speech nobelprize.org
Nobel diploma nobelprize.org
Banquet speech nobelprize.org
Article nobelprize.org

1970
Aleksandr Solzhenitsyn